A turbo timer is a device designed to keep an automotive engine running for a pre-specified period in order to automatically execute the cool-down period required to prevent premature turbo wear and failure. After a period of driving when a turbocharger has been working hard, it is important to let the engine run at idle speed for a period, allowing the compressor assembly to cool from the lower gas temperatures in both the exhaust and intake tracts. At the same time the lubricating oil from the engine is able to circulate properly so the turbine won't burn the lubricating oil that would otherwise be trapped within the charger with the turbine rotating at high speed.  With regard to modern automotive turbochargers, the need for a turbo timer can be eliminated by simply ensuring the car does not produce any 'boost' (during driving) for several minutes prior to the ignition being shut off.
Most turbo timers are based on digital electronics.

Turbo timers can usually be disabled by an external switch, this is normally done using the handbrake switch, or using an automatic one.
Engine lubrication systems
Engine technology
Automotive engine technologies
Turbochargers